Isobel Victoria Steele (born 28 December 2000) is an English actress, she is best known for her role as Liv Flaherty in Emmerdale from February 2016 to October 2022 when her character was killed off as part of the show's 50th anniversary. For her role as Liv, she has been nominated for and won various awards, including a nomination for the British Soap Award for Best Newcomer in 2016, and winning the Best Young Actor award at both the British Soap Awards and the Inside Soap Awards.

Career
Between 2008 and 2010, Steele appeared in commercials for Park Foods, Iceland, Harveys Furniture and Bernard Matthews Ltd. For BBC Learning in 2013, she played Nicky in Lost. Steele appeared in Our Zoo in 2014 as Barbara. She also played Chloe in a short film, A Father's Day. Steele appeared in episode of The Dumping Ground in series 4 playing Kara. In 2016, Steele was cast as Liv Flaherty in Emmerdale, the half-sister of Aaron Dingle (Danny Miller). She took a break from the show in 2017 to sit her GCSE exams. Steele also posts original and cover songs on her YouTube channel. In November 2019, Steele released an extended play, Sounds from the Lounge. In October 2022, it was announced that Steele had made the decision to leave Emmerdale to focus on her music career.

Filmography

Awards and nominations

References

External links

2000 births
Living people
English television actresses
English soap opera actresses
English child actresses
British child actresses
21st-century English actresses
Actresses from Salford
Actresses from Lancashire